Ada Programming Support Environment or APSE, was a specification for a programming environment to support software development in the Ada programming language. This represented the second stage of the U.S. military Ada project; once the language was implemented, it was felt necessary to specify and implement a standard set of tools, hence the APSE. CAIS-A, Common APSE Interface Set A, was defined in MIL STD-1838A.

CAIS defines a set of Ada APIs to enable portability of development tools across operating systems. As of 1988, CAIS implementations were developed for Unix, VMS and IBM MVS.

References

Further reading 

 International Requirements and Design Criteria for the Portable Common Interface Set (1992-05-01)
 DoD Requirements and Design Criteria for the Common APSE Interface Set (CAIS) (July 1987)
 
 
 
 
 
 

Ada (programming language)